Adamu Audu Maikori (1942 – 8 September 2020) was a Nigerian lawyer, banker and politician. In mid-September 2020, the Fundamental Rights in the Nigeria constitution was translated into his mother tongue, Hyam, by the Kaduna-based firm, House of Justice in his honour as the first indigenous lawyer from Southern Kaduna. This document was presented at the palace of the Kpop Ham, in Kwoi by the organisation's CEO, Gloria Mabeiam Ballason, Esq.

Life and education
Maikori was born in Dura, Hyamland, in 1942. He began his educational career in Maude Primary School, Kwoi. Over time, he went further to acquire premium education in London, Germany and Harvard Business School in the U.S.A. He married La'aitu (née Gyet Maude) of the Ham Royal House and their marriage was blessed with five children, including Yahaya Maikori and Audu Maikori, both of whom are lawyers. At the time of death, he had three grandchildren and many "spiritual children".

Working career
Maikori is the first lawyer from Southern Kaduna and was called to the Nigerian Bar in 1972 . He had an illustrious career as a lawyer, teacher, flight cadet in the Nigerian Air Force, public prosecutor and severally as a banker.

He served as Director of Public Prosecutions in the Ministry of Justice and later as Chief Registrar of the Kaduna- Katsina High Court. On leaving public service, he became the Executive Director of Nigeria Merchant Bank and afterwards became a co-founder of North South Bank.

He was also the Chairman of the ECWA working committee on the book, An Introduction to the History of SIM/ECWA in Nigeria, 1893-1993.

Political career
Maikori in 1990 contested the seat of Governor of Kaduna State but was unsuccessful in the primaries; he lost the SDP ticket to Prof. Ango Abdullahi who scored 166,857 votes (59.7%) while he scored 67,312 votes (21%). He also contested but was  unsuccessful in 2003 and 2007 races for the Senate to represent Kaduna South Senatorial district, both of which he lost to Isaiah Balat and Caleb Zagi, respectively.

Demise
His son, a co-founder of the Chocolate City Group, Audu Maikori, reportedly announced the death of his father, on 8 September 2020, aged 78.

Legacy
In his words, his son Audu recounts:

References

1942 births
2020 deaths
People from Kaduna State
20th-century Nigerian lawyers
Nigerian bankers
Nigerian Air Force personnel